Harald Sandberg (born March 12, 1950) is a Swedish diplomat and civil servant who served as Swedish ambassador to Indonesia (1998–2003), East Timor (2002–2003), South Korea (2003–2005), and India (2012-2017). Having acted as an observer in the 1999 East Timorese elections and headed up the Swedish response to the 2002 Bali bombing, Sandberg was selected in July 2006 by the Swedish government to head up its mission to evacuate Swedish citizens from war ravaged Lebanon. At the Foreign Ministry in Stockholm, Sandberg served as Head of the Private Office of the Minister for European Affairs and Foreign Trade, as Deputy Head of the Cabinet Offices EU Co-ordination Secretariat, as Deputy Head of the Department for International Trade Policy and as Head of Department for the EU Internal Market and for Promotion of Swedish Trade. Sandberg acted as the Head of Human Resources for the Swedish foreign service between 2008 and 2012. Following his retirement from the foreign service in 2017, he is now active as an adviser to Swedish industry.

In September 2005, Ambassador Sandberg received a decoration from the Korean national Red Cross for his work for Human Rights in North Korea

References

1950 births
Living people
Ambassadors of Sweden to Indonesia
Ambassadors of Sweden to South Korea
Ambassadors of Sweden to India
Ambassadors of Sweden to East Timor
20th-century Swedish people
21st-century Swedish people